Lakh Taka is a Bengali drama film directed by Niren Lahiri, and starring Uttam Kumar, Sabitri Chatterjee, Bhanu Banerjee, Chhabi Biswas and Jahor Roy. The music direction is by Shyamal Mitra and Niren Lahiri. It was released on 1 January 1953 in the banner of Satabdi Chitra Pratisthan.

Plot
The movie tells about the story of fakkaram a.k.a fakka and his love along with his family and his greedy relatives in search of a valuable amount of money left by a millionaire.

Cast
 Sabitri Chatterjee
 Uttam Kumar
 Bhanu Banerjee
 Chhabi Biswas
 Jahor Roy
 Ashu Bose
 Ajit Chatterjee
 Nripati Chattopadhyay
 Belarani Devi 
 Nabadwip Haldar
 Shyam Laha
 Renuka Roy

References

External links
 

1953 films
Bengali-language Indian films
1953 drama films
1950s Bengali-language films
Indian drama films